Andrés Molteni was the defending champion, but he lost in the first round.
Guido Pella won the title, defeating Paolo Lorenzi 1–6, 7–5, 6–3 in the final.

Seeds

Draw

Finals

Top half

Bottom half

References
 Main Draw
 Qualifying Draw

Challenger ATP de Salinas Diario Expreso - Singles
2012 Singles